The NRA is the National Rifle Association of America, a gun rights advocacy group based in the United States.

NRA may also refer to:

Organizations

Asia and Oceania
 National Revolutionary Army, the National Army of the Republic of China from 1925
 National Railway Administration, the national railway regulator of China
 New Revolutionary Alternative, an anarchist organization in Russia
 National Republican Army, an underground Russian partisan group
 Nuclear Regulation Authority, in Japan
 Nature Reserves Authority, a predecessor of Israel Nature and Parks Authority
 National Rifle Association of Australia
 National Rifle Association of New Zealand

Africa
 National Reconstruction Alliance, a political party in Tanzania
 National Resistance Army, in Uganda
 South African National Roads Agency

Europe
 National Roads Authority of Ireland
 Neutelings Riedijk Architects, in the Netherlands

United Kingdom
 National Register of Archives
 National Rifle Association (of the United Kingdom)
 National Rivers Authority, a forerunner of the Environment Agency of England and Wales
 National Rounders Association, in the List of international sports federations

United States
 National Recovery Administration, a former agency established in 1933
 National Reform Association (1864), an organization seeking to amend the U.S. Constitution to include a Christian amendment
 National Restaurant Association, a restaurant industry business association

Science and technology
 Norepinephrine releasing agent, a type of drug
 Nuclear reaction analysis, a nuclear method of nuclear spectroscopy in materials science

Other uses
 National recreation area, a designation for a protected area in the US
 Nonresident alien, in US immigration law
 New Red Arrow, brand name applied to the Japanese Seibu 10000 series train
 New Rubinelle Army, a faction in the video game Advance Wars: Days of Ruin
 Narrandera Airport, IATA airport code "NRA"

See also
 National Rifle Association (disambiguation)